In abstract algebra, a matrix field is a field with matrices as elements. In field theory there are two types of fields: finite fields and infinite fields. There are several examples of matrix fields of different characteristic and cardinality.

There is a finite matrix field of cardinality p for each prime p. One can find several finite matrix fields of characteristic p for any given prime number p. In general, corresponding to each finite field there is a matrix field. Since any two finite fields of equal cardinality are isomorphic, the elements of a finite field can be represented by matrices.

Contrary to the general case for matrix multiplication, multiplication is commutative in a matrix field (if the usual operations are used). Since addition and multiplication of matrices have all needed properties for field operations except for commutativity of multiplication and existence of multiplicative inverses, one way to verify if a set of matrices is a field with the usual operations of matrix sum and multiplication is to check whether 

 the set is closed under addition, subtraction and multiplication;
 the neutral element for matrix addition (that is, the zero matrix) is included;
 multiplication is commutative;
 the set contains a multiplicative identity (note that this does not have to be the identity matrix); and
 each matrix that is not the zero matrix has a multiplicative inverse.

Examples
1. Take the set of all n × n matrices of the form

with   that is, matrices filled with zeroes except for the first row, which is filled with the same real constant .
These matrices are commutative for multiplication:
.

The multiplicative identity is
.

It is easy to see that this matrix field is isomorphic to the field of real numbers under the map .

2. The set of matrices of the form

where  and  range over the field of real numbers,
forms a matrix field which is isomorphic to the field  of complex numbers:  corresponds to the real part of the number, while  corresponds to the imaginary part. So the number , for example, would be represented as

One can easily verify that :

and also, by computing a matrix exponential, that Euler's identity,  is valid:
.

See also

 Field theory
 Finite field 
 Algebraic structure
 Galois theory
 Matrix ring
 Matrix group

References

Field (mathematics)
Algebraic structures

Matrices